A Home Counties cricket team was a cricket team formed of players who represented counties which were considered a part of England's home counties. The team first appeared in 1862 in a minor match against Southgate Cricket Club. The team later appeared once in first-class cricket in 1899 against The Rest at the Central Recreation Ground, Hastings. The team for their only first-class match consisted of Arthur Turner and Sailor Young of Essex; Alec Hearne and Bill Bradley of Kent; Francis Ford and Andrew Stoddart of Middlesex; Bobby Abel, Tom Hayward and Digby Jephson of Surrey and; Harry Butt and K. S. Ranjitsinhji of Sussex. With the exception of Jephson and Turner, all had played Test cricket for England. Their only appearance in first-class cricket ended as a draw. The team reappeared in the 1940s, playing two minor matches against Lancashire in 1946 and 1948.

References

Bibliography

External links
Home Counties  at CricketArchive

English club cricket teams
Former senior cricket clubs
Home counties